The Well may refer to:

Titled works
 "The Well" (Agents of S.H.I.E.L.D.), a 2013 television episode of Agents of S.H.I.E.L.D.
 The Well (novel), 1986 novel by Elizabeth Jolley
 The Well (TV series), UK TV series
 "The Well" (The Walking Dead), a 2016 television episode of The Walking Dead
 The Well, a 1967 novel by Chaim Grade 
 The Well, a 2021 horror game

Music
 The Well (Jennifer Warnes album), 2001
 The Well (Waking Ashland album), 2007
 The Well (Charlie Musselwhite album), 2010
 The Well (Tord Gustavsen album), 2012
 "The Well", a 2011 song by Casting Crowns from Come to the Well
 "The Well", a 1978 song by The Band from The Last Waltz
 "The Well", a 2018 song by Trixie Mattel from One Stone

Films
 The Well (1913 film), American
 The Well (1951 film), American
 The Well (1991 film), Bulgarian
 The Well (1997 film), Australian
 The Well (2010 film), Indian
 The Well (2013 film), Mexican
 The Well (2015 film), Algerian

Other
 The WELL (The Whole Earth 'Lectronic Link), an online community
 Motherwell F.C., or The Well, a Scottish football club

See also
 Well (disambiguation)